Pełczyn  is a village in the administrative district of Gmina Trawniki, within Świdnik County, Lublin Voivodeship, in eastern Poland.

References

Villages in Świdnik County